Run for Cover is the second studio album by American female folk group The Living Sisters. It was released in January 2013 under Vanguard Records.

Track list

Personnel
Group members
 Inara George - vocals
 Alex Lilly - vocals, piano
 Eleni Mandell - vocals, guitar
 Becky Stark - vocals
Additional personnel
 Jeremy Drake - guitar
 Ryan Feves - bass
 Don Heffington - drums
 Greg Leisz - pedal steel guitar
 Tim Young - guitar

References

External links
Run for Cover by The Living Sisters at iTunes.com

2013 albums
Vanguard Records albums